Mono Esi (Greek: Μόνο Εσύ) is the debut album by Greek musician Giannis Ploutarhos, released in 1999 by Minos EMI in Greece and Cyprus. The songs "Enas Theos", "O,ti Ki An Mou Les", and "Mipos Ertheis" were previously released on the artist's self-titled debut EP.

Track listing

Singles
"Enas Theos"
The first single from the album was "Enas Theos", which was released on the Giannis Ploutarhos EP. It was composed by Alekos Chrisovergis with lyrics by Spiros Giatras.

"Mono Esi" 
The second single from the album was "Mono Esi."

References

External links
Giannis Ploutarhos at Minos EMI official site

1999 debut albums
Giannis Ploutarhos albums
Greek-language albums
Minos EMI albums